The Social Democratic Labour Party was a political party in Trinidad and Tobago. It contested the 1976 general elections, but received just 1.9% of the vote and failed to win a seat. It did not contest any further elections.

References

Defunct political parties in Trinidad and Tobago
Labour parties